The angel face is a cocktail made from gin, apricot brandy and Calvados in equal amounts.

The cocktail first appears in the Savoy Cocktail Book compiled by Harry Craddock in 1930.

See also

 List of cocktails
 List of cocktails (alphabetical)
 List of IBA official cocktails

References

Cocktails with gin